Meira Paibi (Women torch bearers) is a women's social movement in the Indian state of Manipur. Referred to as the "guardians of civil society", Meira Paibi dates to 1977 in present Kakching district. It derives its name from the flaming torches which the women carry while marching through city streets, often at night. They do so both as a patrol, and in protest, seeking redress against human rights violations committed by paramilitary and armed forces units against the innocent. Contextualized, Meira Paibi was founded at a time when the people of Manipur were fighting for self-determination, political autonomy, and independence.

According to The Times of India, Meira Paibi is the "largest grassroots, civilian movement fighting state atrocities and human rights violations in Manipur". One of the movement's leaders, A. K. Janaki Leima, says that "We've been fighting against drug abuse, crimes against women, and the Armed Forces Special Powers Act (AFSPA). We will continue to fight these".

Background
Meira Paibi was established in 1977 in Kakching, kakching district, Manipur, India. Meira Paibis are the women "guardians of civil society" and they carry flaming torches and march through city streets, frequently at night doing a patrol duty, and as a way of protest for seeking redress against human rights violations committed by paramilitary and armed forces units against the innocent. The movement evolved at a time when the people of Manipur were fighting for self-determination, political autonomy, and independence.

Predecessor movements

Nupi lan

Women's social movements in Manipur date to British rule. Two such movements, collectively known as Nupi lan (Women's War; Women's Uprising), preceded Meira Paibi. The first one dates to 1904 when women of the Imphal valley protested against the Assistant Superintendent of British authority in Manipur because of his directive to collect teak wood from Kabas to build his house. The women who protested were neighbors in the locality. British authorities brought forces from outside the state to end this women's protest. A second movement occurred in 1939 as protest to forced rice exportation which was causing starvation among the local people. Women, nearly 99% of them, protested peacefully, submitting a petition to the Durbar (government authority). The movement forced closure of rice mills and eventually proved successful in halting the exportation of rice. Nupi Lan became the forerunner in introducing reforms in the state after World War II. 12 December is observed annually by Meira Paibi as "Women's War Day" commemorating the events of 1939.

Nisha Bandis
The Nisha Bandis women's movement developed in the late 1970s. Its origins are attributed to Meitei women's activism combating alcoholism and drug addiction. The women held night marches in the streets of Imphal and elsewhere in Manipur carrying lanterns, chastising the intoxicated, and setting fire to liquor shops. Their actions lead to the introduction of prohibition laws in the state. The late 1970s was a period of civil unrest, which established an underground insurgency movement in Manipur. The Armed Forces Special Powers Assam and Manipur Act 1958 permitted paramilitary forces and the police to use unlimited power in dealing with insurgency, resulting in the arrest, torture, and deaths of many innocent young people. The Nisha Bandis became socially active with vigilante activities, protests and marches through the streets of Imphal and elsewhere in the state.

Establishment

The Meitei women torch bearers represented the declaration of a just war defending human rights in Manipur. Their movement has expanded to hold "public meetings, demonstrations, road closures and public bandhs or shut down of all essential services, hunger strikes and mass rallies." These women, also known as "women vigilantes", stopped army vehicles, rescued innocent youth who were apprehended on false charges, and negotiated their transfer to the police. The Army did not protest as they respected the role of Meitei women in just causes. The Meira Paibi's movement has become known as the third Nupi Lan.

Recognition
Times of India awarded the "TOI Social Impact Awards: Lifetime contribution" to Meira Paibi and its five leaders, the 83-year-old Thokchom Ramani, Ak Janaki Leima, L Memchoubi Devi, Y Leirik Leima, and Purnimashi Leima. These five women  -known as "imas" or mothers- take an aggressive posture by lowering their traditional phanek (floral embroidered Meitei sarong), tie it with a cloth belt (khwang chet), and cover their shoulders with the formal phi (embroidered phanek). They also tie a piece of cloth over their head in the form of a turban. They carry the flaming torch as a symbol of their feminist movement supporting human rights and peace.
Uday  awarded the
Struggle of Meira Paibi
Their fought for the struggle using torch. Many named it with many names but it was Meira Paibi's Movement.

See also 

 Ima Market

References

Bibliography

Indian women activists
People from Thoubal district
Community activists
Anti-corruption activism in India
Indian human rights activists
Social movements in India
Meitei people
History of Manipur
Activists from Manipur
Women from Manipur
20th-century Indian women
20th-century Indian people